The former Defence House is historic office building in Wellington, New Zealand. For many decades the building housed the New Zealand Defence Force, and after a period of vacancy and subsequent extensive refurbishment, it is now occupied by the Ministry of Business, Innovation and Employment.

The building is classified as a Category 2 historic building by Heritage New Zealand.

History
In 2007, the New Zealand Defence Force moved out of the building after tenanting the building since its construction in the 1940s. The building was no longer fit-for-purpose, and according to the Defence Force: "Despite refurbishments the décor remained dull and dated and the building’s services were inefficient." The Defence Force flags were taken down on 23 February 2007 in a ceremony to close of the building.

In December 2012, it was announced that the building would be bought by Argosy Property Management for $33.2 million. A 12-year tenancy agreement was signed between Argosy and the New Zealand Government in January 2013.

Occupation by MBIE
In late 2014, about 2,000 Ministry of Business, Innovation and Employment employees moved from five Wellington buildings into the 15 Stout Street building.

The relocation had a capital budget of over $18 million, but ultimately $16 million was spent. Operational expenditure on the move was $688,000. The costs involved with the refurbishment were controversial, including the almost $70,000 cost of the MBIE sign outside the building, and the $360,000 cost of office furniture ($1800 per staff member).

References

External links

Profile of the building, Architecture Now (2014)

Heritage New Zealand Category 2 historic places in the Wellington Region
Buildings and structures in Wellington City